Sergio Nelson Zeballos Martínez (born 26 September 1987) is a Bolivian football manager, currently in charge of Aurora's youth squads.

Career
Born in Cochabamba, Zeballos began his career as an assistant at Municipal Tiquipaya's youth categories before joining Aurora in 2016, as a youth manager. On 17 December 2020, he was named interim manager of the latter, after Julio César Baldivieso was sacked.

Zeballos returned to his former role after the appointment of Humberto Viviani, but was named manager of the team on 18 October 2021, after Viviani resigned. He himself resigned from the managerial role on 19 February 2022, but returned to the role in an interim manner on 13 September.

References

External links

1987 births
Living people
Sportspeople from Cochabamba
Bolivian football managers
Bolivian Primera División managers
Club Aurora managers